The 2019 World Women's Snooker Championship was a women's snooker tournament that took place at the Hi-End Snooker Club, Bangkok from 20 to 23 June 2019. Reanne Evans won the event with a 6–3 victory against Nutcharut Wongharuthai in the final. This was Evans' twelfth world championship victory.

Prize fund 
The breakdown of prize money for the event is shown below:

 Winner: £5,500
 Runner-up: £2,500
 Semi-final: £1,250
 Quarter-final: £500
 Last 16: £250
 Highest break: £200
 Total: £14,700

Participants
Participants had to be nominated by their national snooker federations. The top 30 players in the World Women's Snooker rankings following the Festival of Women's Snooker events were eligible, and national federations were each able to nominate up to eight further players.

The event featured 53 players, from 14 different countries. There were twelve seeded players for the qualifying phase, with one drawn into each of the twelve qualifying groups.

Tournament summary

Qualifying Groups

The group stage began 20 June. There were twelve groups, each with either four or five players. The top two qualifiers from each group proceeded into the knockout stage. Reanne Evans and Wendy Jans were the only two players not to lose a frame in qualifying and were seeded first and second respectively into the knockout stage. All of the original top twelve seeds qualified for the knockout.

Main draw knockout
Wendy Jans continued her good run from the qualifying groups with 4–0 wins over Arantxa Sanchis in the last 16 and Ploychompoo Laokiatphong to reach 17  won with none lost in the tournament to that point. Defending champion Ng On-yee was also beaten in a quarter-final match, losing 1–4 to Nutcharut Wongharuthai. In the semi-finals,  Evans beat Baipat Siripaporn 5–3 and Wongharuthai beat Jans 5–2.

Evans beat Wongharuthai 6–3 in the final to win her twelfth World Women's Snooker Championship title, maintaining her record of never having lost in the final, and collected a prize of £6,000. An early day motion congratulating Evans on her win was tabled in the Parliament of the United Kingdom by Ian Austin, the Member of Parliament for Dudley North.

The highest break of the tournament was 92 by Evans.

Challenge Cup
So Man Yan won the Challenge Cup event for players who did not qualify for the knockout rounds of the main competition, beating Chitra Magimairaj 3–2 in the final.

Results

Main draw
Players listed in bold indicate match winner.

Final
Source: WPBSA Tournament Manager.

References

External links
Qualifying Group Results (WPBSA Tournament Manager)
Tournament Final:Reanne Evans vs Nutcharut Wongharuthai (YouTube)

World Women's Snooker Championship
Women's
2019 in women's sport
2019 in Thai sport
June 2019 sports events in Asia
International sports competitions hosted by Thailand
Sports competitions in Bangkok